Sympathetic Sounds of Detroit is a compilation album of American garage rock and punk bands from Detroit, released in 2001. Put together by Jack White of the White Stripes, it featured bands such as the Von Bondies, the Dirtbombs, and the Detroit Cobras. It was recorded in the home of Jack White, and he, along with nephew and the Dirtbombs drummer Ben Blackwell can be heard singing backup on "Shaky Puddin'," a Soledad Brothers track.

Jack White produced the album to preserve the work of a few bands who were a significant part of Detroit's music scene in the 1990's, but wre unlikely to achieve the same level of mainstream success as the White Stripes.

Track listing
"Black Girl" – The Paybacks
"Payback Blues" – The Paybacks
"Dirtbomb Blues" – The Dirtbombs
"I'm Through with White Girls" – The Dirtbombs
"Accusatory" – The Hentchmen
"Black and Blue" – Ko & the Knockouts
"Come on Blues" – Come Ons
"Sunday Drive" – Come Ons
"Soledad Blues" – Soledad Brothers
"Shaky Puddin'" – Soledad Brothers
"Sound of Terror" – The Von Bondies
"High Class" – The Buzzards
"Shout Bama Lama" – The Detroit Cobras
"Banty Rooster Blues" – Bantam Rooster
"Run Rabbit Run" – Bantam Rooster
"Whiskey 'n Women" – Clone Defects
"Decal on My Sticker" – Whirlwind Heat
"Red Death at 6:14" – The White Stripes
"Buzzard Blues" – The Buzzards

References

2001 compilation albums
Albums produced by Jack White
Garage rock revival albums
Music of Detroit
Punk rock compilation albums